Plectranthus hadiensis is a perennial herbaceous plant of the family Lamiaceae.

Description 
Plectranthus hadiensis is a perennial herbaceous shrub with pubescent and semi-succulent stems, and a straight to decumbent habit. Its height varies 50 cm to 1.5 m, with a maximum base diameter of 1m. The leaves of the plant are arranged alternately on the plant's stem, they have coarse textures; an ovate shape; densely woolly-tomentose;  are apex acute to rounded, cuneate with subcordate base; and a superficial to fairly crenate-dentate margin. The petiole is 10 to 40 mm long. The terminal inflorescences of the plant are simple and have 1 to 2 pairs of lateral branches near the base. The flowers of the plant are generally in shades of mauve to purple (occasionally white), and are bilabiated with a tube-shaped corolla of 8 to 15 mm that widens from the base, finely pubescent and with glands on the lips.

There are three varieties of P. hadiensis:

 Variety hadiensis, distributed in coastal and midland areas of the KwaZulu-Natal woodlands and the east of South Africa;
 Variety tomentosus, in semi-coastal zones from the Great Kei River to the KwaZulu-Natal coast.
 Variety woodii, distributed in arid habitats in eastern Cape and KwaZulu-Natal.

Distribution and habitat 
The species is found in Transkei, Natal, Eswatini, the Transvaal, eastern tropical Africa, Somalia and the southern Arabian Peninsula. The plant can be found on the fringes of forests, in dry forests and amongst rocks in grasslands and lowlands.

Cultivation and uses 
Plectranthus hadiensis is widely used as an ornamental plant because it is easy to cultivate, propagate and maintain. The compounds of the plant were formerly used to poison fish and more traditionally as an enema. In popular culture it is used to ward off evil spirits.
In Uganda it is used to heal wounds and peptic ulcers

Properties 
The plant's use as a pharmacological agent is being investigated as it contains large quantities of essential oils, it is also being investigated for use against respiratory infections. However, ointments made with compounds extracted from the plant must not contain menthol, camphor or eucalyptus.

Taxonomy 
Plectranthus hadiensis was discovered by Peter Forsskål in Hadiyah, Yemen. It was described in Flora of Egypt and Arabia in 1775 with the name Ocimum hadiensis. At that time the genus Plectranthus had not been established, however it was the first species of the genus described and in 1894 the botanists Schweinfurth and Sprenger transferred it to the new genus, publishing it in Wiener Illustrirte Garten-Zeitung 19: 2. 1894.

References

Bibliography 

 AFPD. 2008. African Flowering Plants Database - Base de Donnees des Plantes a Fleurs D'Afrique.

External links 

Plants described in 1894
Flora of Africa
Medicinal plants
hadiensis